Marr is a town in Aberdeenshire, Scotland.

Marr may also refer to:
 Marr (surname)

Businesses
 Marr (automobile) (1903–1904), an American automobile company
 Marr & Holman, an American architectural firm
 Marr and Colton, an American pipe organ company

Places
 Marr, South Yorkshire, England
 Marr College, a school in Troon, South Ayrshire, Scotland
 Marr Residence, a historic site in Saskatoon, Saskatchewan, Canada
 Birrarung Marr, Melbourne, an inner-city park in Melbourne, Victoria, Australia

Other uses
 Marr baronets, a British title
 Marr Prize, a computer vision award
 Marr–Hildreth algorithm, a digital image edge detection method
 Marr, or Marrette, a twist-on wire connector 
 The Andrew Marr Show, a British television series
 Minimum acceptable rate of return (MARR), a project finance concept

See also 
 Mar (disambiguation)
 Marre, a commune in Meuse, Grand Est, France
 Marre (surname)
 MARRS, a recording collective
 Mars (disambiguation)